Nedjm Chabab Magra, known as NC Magra or NCM for short, is an Algerian football club based in the city of Magra in the M'Sila Province. The club was founded in 1998 and its colours are Blue and white. Their home stadium, the Boucheligue Brothers Stadium, has a capacity of 5,000 spectators. The club is currently playing in the Algerian Ligue Professionnelle 1

History
In 2004, NC Magra reached the semi-finals of the 2003–04 Algerian Cup. However, in the semi-finals, they lost 3–0 to JS Kabylie.

On 5 May 2018, NC Magra promoted to the Algerian Ligue Professionnelle 2 after winning 2017–18 Ligue Nationale du Football Amateur "Group Centre".

In 2020–21 season NC Magra signed a number of young players, and the goal was to ensure that they remained in the Ligue 1, and with the establishment of the League Cup competition, the club had ambitions and despite its involvement with large clubs, it was able to overcome it in the form of CS Constantine, CR Belouizdad and USM Alger. To reach the final of the first tournament in its history where he faced JS Kabylie and was defeated by penalty kicks.

Players

Algerian teams are limited to two foreign players. The squad list includes only the principal nationality of each player;

Current squad

Personnel

Current technical staff

References

External links

 
M'Sila Province
Association football clubs established in 1998
1998 establishments in Algeria